Seyyed Mahalleh may refer to:
 Seyyed Mahalleh, Lahijan, Gilan Province
 Seyyed Mahalleh, Masal, Gilan Province
 Seyyed Mahalleh, Talesh, Gilan Province
 Seyyed Mahalleh, Abbasabad, Mazandaran Province
 Seyyed Mahalleh, Babolsar, Mazandaran Province
 Seyyed Mahalleh, Sari, Mazandaran Province
 Seyyed Mahalleh, Tehran